Brent Sherman (born May 24, 1974) is an American professional racing driver who competed in the ARCA Racing Series, NASCAR, and the Firestone Indy Lights Series.

Racing career
Sherman's route to NASCAR was not like that of most drivers. After high school, he completed a six-year enlistment in the U.S. Air Force as an Air Surveillance Technician on the E-3 AWACS. It was during his last year in the Air Force that racing caught Sherman's attention. After a trip to the Jim Russell Racing School in Sonoma, California, Sherman was asked to compete for a racing scholarship in the Russell Champ Series. He won the scholarship and his racing career began.

During the next few years Sherman competed in several different racing series including the Barber Dodge Pro Series, Grand American Road Racing Association and the ARCA Re/Max Series.

In 2003, driving a Ford sponsored by Serta Mattresses, he collected six top-5 and 11 top-10 finishes in ARCA competition and finished fourth in the final point standings. The following year he posted nine top-5 and 14 top-10 finishes, which placed him second in the series’ point standings. He also received the prestigious Bill France Triple Crown honor and the HG Adcox Sportsman of the Year Award.

Sherman competed in a handful of NASCAR Busch Series races in 2004 in the No. 58 Serta Dodge for Akins Motorsports and planned to run a full schedule with the team in 2005. Glynn Motorsports bought out his team and after 11 races and one top-10 finish between the two teams, Sherman and his sponsors parted ways with the team. In July 2005, Sherman signed on with ppc Racing, replacing Michel Jourdain Jr., and brought the Serta sponsorship with him (along with Hickory Farms and Consort hair spray).

In 2006, Sherman moved up to the NEXTEL Cup Series. Bringing Serta as his primary sponsor, he was signed to drive the No. 49 for BAM Racing, replacing Ken Schrader, who moved to Wood Brothers Racing that year. His best finish was a 21st-place finish in the Daytona 500. After poor performance, BAM Racing asked Sherman to step aside while the team tested other drivers. He resigned from the team (taking the sponsorship with him) and returned to the ARCA Re/Max Series for the remainder of the 2006 season. This turned out to be a good move, and Sherman scored his first ARCA win at Michigan, and finished 19th in points despite starting the season late. In 2007, he left ARCA again and returned to the Busch Series to drive the No. 36 Big Lots Chevy for McGill Motorsports. He departed the team in September, and would spend the remainder of the season driving a limited schedule for Braun Racing in their No. 10 Toyota.

On February 19, 2008, it was announced that Sherman had signed with Panther Racing to move to the Firestone Indy Lights Series for the 2008 season. He finished 11th in points with a best finish of 3rd which came in the first race of the year at Homestead-Miami Speedway. His best road course finish was 10th in a rain drenched attrition filled race at the Mid-Ohio Sports Car Course.

In 2009, he drove in a few Camping World Truck Series races for Stringer Motorsports in the No. 90 Great Clips Toyota as well as one ARCA race at Salem, also in Stringer's No. 90.

After five years of being without a ride, Sherman came back to stock car racing in a one-off attempt with Mason Mitchell's No. 98 team in the ARCA race at Chicago in 2016. He shook the rust off pretty quickly and earned a top-10 finish in 9th after qualifying 11th. However, despite this surprise comeback, Sherman has yet to attempt any other races in any series since that one race.

Motorsports career results

NASCAR
(key) (Bold – Pole position awarded by qualifying time. Italics – Pole position earned by points standings or practice time. * – Most laps led.)

Nextel Cup Series

Daytona 500

Busch Series

Camping World Truck Series

ARCA Racing Series
(key) (Bold – Pole position awarded by qualifying time. Italics – Pole position earned by points standings or practice time. * – Most laps led.)

American open-wheel racing results
(key) (Races in bold indicate pole position, races in italics indicate fastest race lap)

Barber Dodge Pro Series

Indy Lights

References
Substitutions frustrate rookie, Pioneer Press
Sherman still chasing NASCAR's top drivers, Pioneer Press

External links
 
 

1974 births
ARCA Menards Series drivers
Rolex Sports Car Series drivers
Indy Lights drivers
Living people
NASCAR drivers
People from Wauconda, Illinois
United States Air Force airmen
Racing drivers from Illinois
Racing drivers from Minnesota
Barber Pro Series drivers
Sportspeople from Saint Paul, Minnesota
Military personnel from Minnesota
Cheever Racing drivers
Panther Racing drivers